The following is a list of 2019 box office number-one films in Paraguay.

Films

Biggest opening week
This list charts films that had openings in excess of 50,000 tickets sold in their first week.

See also 
 Lists of box office number-one films
 2019 in film

References

External links 
Ultracine

2019
Paraguay
2019 in Paraguay